Captain Matthew Webb (19 January 1848 – 24 July 1883) was an English swimmer and stuntman. He is the first recorded person to swim the English Channel for sport without the use of artificial aids. In 1875, Webb swam from Dover to Calais in less than 22 hours. This made him a celebrity, and he performed many stunts in public. He died trying to swim the Whirlpool Rapids below Niagara Falls, a feat declared impossible.

Early life and career
Webb was born in High Street, Dawley (now part of Telford), in Shropshire, one of fourteen children of a surgeon. Matthew Webb, and his wife Sarah Cartwright Webb, who moved with the family to Madeley High Street in 1849, and then by 1856 to Eastfield House, Coalbrookdale. He acquired his ability to swim in the River Severn at Coalbrookdale. In 1860, at the age of twelve, he joined the training ship HMS Conway for two years, then entered the merchant navy and served an apprenticeship with Rathbone Brothers of Liverpool.

Whilst serving as second mate on the Cunard Line ship Russia, travelling from New York to Liverpool, Webb attempted to rescue a man overboard by diving into the sea in the mid-Atlantic. The man was never found, but Webb's daring won him an award of £100 and the first Stanhope Medal, and made him a hero of the British press.

In the summer of 1863, while at home, Webb rescued his 12-year-old brother Thomas from drowning in the Severn near Ironbridge.

English Channel swimming record

In 1873, Webb was serving as captain of the steamship Emerald when he read an account of the failed attempt by J. B. Johnson to swim the English Channel. He became inspired to try, and left his job to begin training, first at Lambeth Baths, then in the cold waters of the Thames, the English Channel and Hollingworth Lake. His early training was backed by Fred Beckwith who was the "Professor" at Lambeth Baths. Beckwith organised a spectacle by showing Webb swimming miles in the River Thames. Webb completed 'nearly six miles' (10 km), but the poor public interest meant that Beckwith lost money. As a result, Webb took another manager.

On 12 August 1875, Webb made his first cross-Channel swimming attempt, but strong winds and poor sea conditions forced him to abandon the swim. On 24 August, he began a second swim by diving in from the Admiralty Pier at Dover. Backed by three escort boats and smeared in porpoise oil, he set off into the ebb tide at a steady breaststroke. Despite stings from jellyfish and strong currents off Cap Gris Nez which prevented him from reaching the shore for five hours, finally, after approximately 21 hours and 40 minutes, he landed near Calais—the first successful cross-channel swim. His zig-zag course across the Channel was nearly 40 miles (66 km) long.

He was the first swimmer to complete a Channel swim without artificial aid; in June 1875, American Paul Boyton had swum across in 24 hours but was wearing an inflatable suit.

Later life
After his record swim, Webb basked in national and international adulation, and followed a career as a professional swimmer. He wrote a book called The Art of Swimming and licensed his name for merchandising such as commemorative pottery. A brand of matches was named after him. He participated in exhibition swimming matches and stunts such as floating in a tank of water for 128 hours.

In May 1879, Webb won the swimming Championship of England at Lambeth Baths, by competing with champions from other cities. He covered a distance of 74 miles by swimming for fourteen hours a day over a period of six days. In September 1879, he competed for the Championship of the World against Paul Boyton. Webb won but was accused of cheating and so the prize money was withheld.

On 27 April 1880, Webb and Madeline Kate Chaddock were married at St Andrew's Church, West Kensington, and they had two children, Matthew and Helen.

Death
Webb's final stunt was to be a dangerous swim through the Whirlpool Rapids on the Niagara River below Niagara Falls, a feat many observers considered suicidal. Although Webb failed in an attempt at raising interest in funding the event, on 24 July 1883, he jumped into the river from a small boat located near the Niagara Falls Suspension Bridge and began his swim. Accounts of the time indicate that in all likelihood Webb successfully survived the first part of the swim, but died in the section of the river located near the entrance to the whirlpool. Webb was interred in Oakwood Cemetery, Niagara Falls, New York.

Legacy
In 1909, Webb's elder brother Thomas unveiled a memorial in Dawley. On it reads the short inscription: "Nothing great is easy." The memorial was taken away for repair after a lorry collided with it in February 2009. The landmark memorial was returned after full restoration and was hoisted back onto its plinth in High Street in October 2009. Two roads in the town (Captain Webb Drive and Webb Crescent) and the Captain Webb Primary School in Dawley are named after the swimmer.

Webb has a statue in Dover, and a memorial plaque with his portrait was also unveiled in the parish church at Coalbrookdale. Webb House of the Adams' Grammar School in Newport, Shropshire, is named after Webb.

A book about Webb's life was written in 1986 entitled "Nothing Great Is Easy" by author David Elderwick. It has the tagline "The Story of Captain Matthew Webb, The First Man To Swim The English Channel".

Matthew Webb's Great Nephew, Edward Webb of Nottingham became the first man to solo paraglide across the English Channel on 12 September 1992. This was 117 years after his Great Uncle crossed the Channel. Edward was just 20 years old at the time but the feat helped to raise £2.5million pounds in fundraising for the Christian Rescue Services Young Children in Need charity.

Cultural references

His death inspired a poem by William McGonagall in 1883.
John Betjeman's poem "A Shropshire Lad" (1940) also commemorates the death of Webb, portraying his ghost swimming back along the canal to Dawley. It was set to music by Jim Parker and was recorded by folk singer John Kirkpatrick.

Webb's picture on boxes of Bryant and May matches is said to have inspired the physical appearance of the Inspector Clouseau character portrayed originally in the Pink Panther films by Peter Sellers.

An episode of Peabody's Improbable History (a segment of Rocky and Bullwinkle) misidentified him in dialogue and the episode's title as "Captain Clift". It was a sly reference to Peabody's voice being patterned after actor Clifton Webb. The character in the episode did, however, resemble Matthew Webb. The joke name also facilitated Peabody's closing pun about the "White Clifts of Dover".

A 2007 Channel 4 documentary named Swimming: A Brief History suggests that Webb's swim was hugely inspirational. Both his Channel crossing and Niagra Falls downfall are discussed and Webb is described as revered for his 'sporting achievements'. The programme also features an artist's illustration of the 1875 channel swim and describes him consuming "beef tea, beer and brandy" during the event.

In 2009 Jim Howick portrayed Webb during a humorous retelling of his death in Episode 4, Series 1 of the CBBC show Horrible Histories.

Production began in 2014 for a full-length film adaptation about Webb's Channel attempt, initially under the working title The Greatest Englishman. It was to be directed by Justin Hardy (best known for The Bill and The Jesus Mysteries), written by Jemma Kennedy (an up-and-coming playwright who had written and adapted a number of stage shows from books) and cast in the leading role as Captain Matthew Webb was Warren Brown (actor). Brown already had some film experience with a minor role in The Dark Knight Rises but was best known for his appearances in the UK TV series Luther (TV series). 
Released in 2015 under the title Captain Webb, the movie was nominated for a British Film Award the following year. However, box office success for Captain Webb (2015) was limited. The film is currently rated 5.7 on Rotten Tomatoes out of only 3 ratings (Jan 2023), and 5.6 on IMdb out 118 ratings (Jan 2023), but interest in his life remains and viewership is slowly gaining traction on streaming services.
Local newspaper Shropshire Star records an article dated 21 Aug 2015. The following day a screening of Captain Webb was due to take place at Dawley Town Hall, and there would also be a "street party" in Dawley to mark the 140th anniversary of Webb's Channel swim that Monday.

See also
 List of members of the International Swimming Hall of Fame
 List of successful English Channel swimmers

References

Further reading

External links

 
 Two images from the Niagara Falls Public Library (Ont.)
 Cemetery where Capt. Webb is interred. – Oakwood Cemetery, Niagara Falls, NY

1848 births
1883 deaths
Accidental deaths in New York (state)
Accidental deaths in Ontario
British Merchant Navy officers
British stunt performers
Deaths by drowning in the United States
English Channel swimmers
English male swimmers
Male long-distance swimmers
Niagara Falls
People educated aboard HMS Conway
People from Dawley